Alphonse Fiquet (8 April 1841 – 14 June 1916) was a French politician. He served as a member of the Chamber of Deputies from 1893 to 1909, representing Somme. He also served as a member of the French Senate from 1909 to 1916, representing Somme.

References

1841 births
1916 deaths
People from Amiens
Politicians from Hauts-de-France
Radical Party (France) politicians
Members of the 6th Chamber of Deputies of the French Third Republic
Members of the 7th Chamber of Deputies of the French Third Republic
Members of the 8th Chamber of Deputies of the French Third Republic
Members of the 9th Chamber of Deputies of the French Third Republic
French Senators of the Third Republic
Senators of Somme (department)